Rémy Riou (born 6 August 1987) is a French professional footballer who plays as a goalkeeper for  club Lyon. He was a France youth international having, earned four caps with the country's under-21 team.

Club career
Riou was a member Lyon's first team since 2003, but failed to make his Ligue 1 debut for the club and moved to Lorient on a one-season loan in July 2006. He made his Ligue 1 debut on 4 November 2006 in the Lorient's 1–0 away victory over Marseille. In July 2007, he moved to Auxerre on a four-year contract, making his Ligue 1 debut for the club on 18 August 2007 in their 1–0 home victory over Caen.

In the summer of 2012, he signed with Nantes.

On 19 July 2017, Riou moved to the Süper Lig joining Alanyaspor on a three-year contract.

On 24 May 2022, aged 34, Riou returned to Lyon, signing a two-year contract. He made his club debut in the first league game of the 2022–23 season, coming on as a substitute to replace the sent-off Anthony Lopes in a 2–1 home win over Ajaccio.

International career
Riou made four appearances for France's U21 team.

Career statistics

Honours
Lyon
Trophée des Champions: 2006

References

External links

 
 

1987 births
Living people
Footballers from Lyon
French footballers
France under-21 international footballers
Association football goalkeepers
Olympique Lyonnais players
FC Lorient players
AJ Auxerre players
Toulouse FC players
FC Nantes players
Alanyaspor footballers
R. Charleroi S.C. players
Stade Malherbe Caen players
Ligue 1 players
Ligue 2 players
Süper Lig players
Belgian Pro League players
French expatriate footballers
Expatriate footballers in Belgium
Expatriate footballers in Turkey
French expatriate sportspeople in Belgium
French expatriate sportspeople in Turkey